During the 1994–95 English football season, Sunderland A.F.C. competed in the Football League First Division.

Season summary
In the 1994–95 season, although a reasonable defensive record was maintained, Sunderland were lacking goals and as a result got entangled in a relegation battle which cost Buxton his job in March 1995. The board then appointed Peter Reid as temporary manager, in the hopes of keeping the Black Cats clear of relegation. That objective was achieved within weeks, and Reid was rewarded with a permanent contract.

Final league table

Results
Sunderland's score comes first

Legend

Football League First Division

FA Cup

League Cup

Players

First-team squad
Squad at end of season

References

Notes

Sunderland A.F.C. seasons
Sunderland